
Year 486 (CDLXXXVI) was a common year starting on Wednesday (link will display the full calendar) of the Julian calendar. At the time, it was known as the Year of the Consulship of Basilius and Longinus (or, less frequently, year 1239 Ab urbe condita). The denomination 486 for this year has been used since the early medieval period, when the Anno Domini calendar era became the prevalent method in Europe for naming years.

Events 
 By place 
 Europe 
 Battle of Soissons: Frankish forces under King Clovis I defeat the Gallo-Roman kingdom of Soissons (Gaul). Roman rule under Syagrius ends. The land between the Somme and the Loire becomes a part of the Frankish Empire. Syagrius flees to the Visigoths (under King Alaric II), but Clovis threatens war, and he is handed over for execution.
 Clovis I establishes his new residence at Soissons. He appoints Ragnachar, Frankish petty king (regulus), as his deputy ruler.

 By topic 
 Religion 
 Persian Christians who follow Nestorianism gather in the second Council of Seleucia (modern Turkey).

Births

Deaths 
 Syagrius, Roman official in Gaul (approximate date)

References